Blepharomastix haedulalis is a moth in the family Crambidae. It is found in Mexico and southern Texas.

The wingspan is about 27 mm. The forewings are powdery grey, with a somewhat carneous underground, shaded darker along the costa. The inner line is blackish and the terminal line is slender and black. The hindwings are silky whitish, with faint carneous tint.

References

Moths described in 1886
Blepharomastix